Murugan Adimai is a 1977 Indian Tamil-language devotional film starring R. Muthuraman, A. V. M. Rajan, K. R. Vijaya in lead roles with Nagesh, Major Sundarrajan and Thengai Srinivasan in supporting roles. The film was directed by R. Thyagarajan and produced by Dhandayuthapani Films. Music was by K. V. Mahadevan.

Plot 
The movie starts with K.R Vijaya being the daughter of a rich man, Major Sundarrajan and being an ardent devotee to the extent of being a slave (hence the title) to Lord Muruga. She comes across a thief, R. Muthuraman who, also like her, is a muruga's slave and steals to help the poor devotees of Muruga. She takes that Muruga has sent him to marry her to fulfill her wish of marrying a murugan slave. Her father disapproves but she goes ahead with it anyway.

The lead an impoverished living after he reforms and hunts for work. At once instance, he is entrusted by his boss to deliver some cash. On the way, he sees that the Muruga temple of the village that needs renovation in bad shape. The person in-charge tries to kill himself having failed in his attempt to complete the same. He gives the cash he has to save the temple and his life. The boss however accuse him of thievery and sends him to jail. KR Vijaya prays to Muruga. Muruga, along with his father, Shiva comes to the boss's house and repays the amount setting him free. At the same time, driver of her father comes and hands over the family property to her as her father is no more. With the money, the couple completes the temple and runs a business successfully.

One day, a group of foreigners, faking themselves of Muruga devotees come to steal the gold statue the couple has and prays to everyday in their home. KR Vijaya sees this in her dream and also sees that they met with an accident. The foreigners reform upon their near death incident. The couple narrates the story of couple of devotees to highlight the grace of the god. After a few days, she becomes pregnant. Lord Muruga comes in her dream again and asks her what child she wants. She says she wants a child who is intelligent and handsome like Muruga. He asks whether there is nothing else she wants in the child for which she says no. Muruga blesses as she requested albeit he will live only for 8 years and disappears.

She refuses to divulge the same to her husband. They have a son (Karan) who everyone praises as the most handsome as well as most intelligent child they have ever seen. However, as the child grows, her fear too does. At one time, when his 8th birthday is nearing, she tells her husband about the dream and her son too hears it. The son runs off seeking the feet of Lord Muruga to save himself. They too do the same. At one point, they decide to kill themselves as they do not want to exist as proof that Lord Muruga has failed a devotee.

They faint as does the kid. Lord Muruga appears and stops Yama who comes to claim his life. He imprisons yama who refuses to acquiesces to Muruga's demand of sparing the child. Shiva & Parvathi, Vishnu and Brahma appear. They try to convince Muruga but Muruga provides counter argument where they went out of the way for their devotees like Markandeya , Prahalada , Abhirama Bhattar. Finally, he takes Viswaroopa saying he is ready for war if that is what they want. They calm him down and tell him that all this argument was for them to see Muruga's viswaroopa. Yama spares the kid's life. When Parvathi asks Muruga why not give the child a long lifespan directly, Muruga says she did not ask for her child to be his devotee and his grace should never be taken for granted. However, once the kid became his devotee by upbringing, he automatically came under his protection.

Cast 
 R. Muthuraman as Thief who reforms after marrying KR Vijaya
 K. R. Vijaya as Valliyammai
 Jaya as Goddess Parvathi, Shiva's wife
 S. A. Ashokan as Yama
 Major Sundararajan as Rich Man, a K.R Vijaya's dad
 A. V. M. Rajan as Lord Shiva
 Thengai Srinivasan as Driver
 Nagesh as Driver's brother-in-law
 Rohini Raghuvaran as young Muruga
 Master Sridhar as adult Muruga
Karan credited as Master Raghu as son of KR Vijaya and Muthuraman

Soundtrack
Soundtrack was composed by K. V. Mahadevan. and lyrics were by Kannadasan.
Sangam Valartha Tamizh - T. M. Soundarrajan
Anandha Thottil - P. Susheela
Thaikaatha Pillai - P. Susheela
Sathyam Sivam - P. Susheela

Reception
Kausikan of Kalki wrote despite the pleasant colors and sweet songs, the tempo seen in Devar's films is lacking here.

References

External links 

1977 films
Films directed by R. Thyagarajan (director)
Hindu devotional films
Films scored by K. V. Mahadevan